Anganur is a village in Ulundurpet taluka, Kallakurichi district, Tamil Nadu, India.

Villages in Kallakurichi district